Sitaram Singh (12 November 1948 – 11 January 2014) was a member of the 14th Lok Sabha of India.

Life
Singh represented the Sheohar constituency of Bihar and was a member of the Rashtriya Janata Dal (RJD) political party. He has served as state minister with independent charge in Bihar from 1990 to 1995. Singh has served as a cabinet minister in Bihar from 1995 to 2004. He has represented Madhuban Assembly seat for four consecutive terms from 1985 to 2004.

References

1948 births
2014 deaths
People from Bihar
India MPs 2004–2009
Rashtriya Janata Dal politicians
Lok Sabha members from Bihar
Rajya Sabha members from Bihar
People from Motihari
People from Sheohar district